Vinzenz Flatz (born 5 July 1994) is a Liechtensteiner international footballer who plays for Swiss club FC Bern, as a midfielder.

Career
Born in Vaduz, Flatz has played club football for Young Boys II, FC Vaduz and FC Konolfingen.

Career

He made his international debut for Liechtenstein in 2012.

References

1994 births
Living people
Liechtenstein footballers
Liechtenstein international footballers
BSC Young Boys players
FC Vaduz players
Association football midfielders
Liechtenstein expatriate footballers
Liechtenstein expatriate sportspeople in Switzerland
Expatriate footballers in Switzerland
People from Vaduz